Substance is a singles compilation album by English rock band Joy Division. It was released on 11 July 1988 by Factory Records. It is the companion to a similar singles compilation by their subsequent band New Order, also entitled Substance. It peaked at number 7 on the UK Albums Chart and 146 on the Billboard 200, the band's only chart appearance in the United States. It also reached number 15 in New Zealand and number 53 in Australia in August 1988.

Content
Substance compiles the four singles released by the band that did not appear on albums — "Transmission", "Komakino", "Love Will Tear Us Apart", and "Atmosphere" — as well as most of their B-sides. It also collects tracks released on various EPs, namely the band's first release, An Ideal for Living, and two samplers issued by Factory Records, A Factory Sample and Earcom 2: Contradiction.

Two of the album's tracks, "Glass" and "Dead Souls", were previously included on the 1981 compilation Still. Additionally, the single "Atmosphere" had been originally issued in France as "Licht und Blindheit" with "Dead Souls" on the B-side; following Ian Curtis's suicide, it was reissued as a posthumous B-side of the "She's Lost Control" 12-inch single. The vinyl version omits the single "Komakino" and does not include the complete titles from the EPs, due to the lower storage capacity of a vinyl record.

Later CD pressings issued by London Records contain a previously unreleased mix of "She's Lost Control" that is slightly different from the original single release. More guitar is mixed within the song, the synthesizer melody is shortened and starts at a later point, and the ending of the song is extended by 15 seconds and does not fade out.

Substance was digitally remastered in 2015, containing not only the alternate mix of "She's Lost Control", but also two additional tracks: "As You Said" (the second B-side of "Komakino") and the initial take of "Love Will Tear Us Apart" (originally released on the B-side of the original single), dubbed the "Pennine Version" after the studio it was recorded at.

Cover
The cover features the title of the album in green spelled with characters from Wim Crouwel's New Alphabet typeface below Joy Division's name and the years of recording in a smaller white font. The letters used in the title actually spell "Subst1mce", rather than "Substance". Brett Wickens, who worked on this cover whilst a partner at Saville Associates, claims this was for aesthetic reasons.
The 1991 cover was different, featuring a large green "S" in the New Alphabet typeface with its lower half encircling Joy Division's name and the years of recording in the same white font used in the original cover.

Track listing

LP (Factory FACT 250)

CD (Factory FACD 250) and cassette (Factory FACT 250C) 
Same tracks as LP plus the following bonus tracks, entitled Appendix:

2015 remastered edition bonus tracks

Personnel
 Ian Curtis — lead vocals
 Bernard Sumner — guitar, synthesizer
 Peter Hook — bass
 Stephen Morris — drums

Certifications

References

Joy Division compilation albums
Albums produced by Martin Hannett
1988 compilation albums
Factory Records compilation albums